Graciliclava is a genus of sea snails, marine gastropod mollusks in the family Horaiclavidae.

It was previously included within the subfamily Crassispirinae, family Turridae. Killburn in 1994 was of the opinion that Graciliclava was closely related to and possibly a subgenus of Anacithara

Species
Species within the genus Graciliclava include:
 Graciliclava costata (Hedley, 1922)
Species brought into synonymy
 Graciliclava mackayensis Shuto, 1983: synonym of Graciliclava costata (Hedley, 1922)

References

External links
  Hedley, C. 1922. A revision of the Australian Turridae. Records of the Australian Museum 13(6): 213-359, pls 42-56
  Tucker, J.K. 2004 Catalog of recent and fossil turrids (Mollusca: Gastropoda). Zootaxa 682:1-1295.
   Bouchet, P.; Kantor, Y. I.; Sysoev, A.; Puillandre, N. (2011). A new operational classification of the Conoidea (Gastropoda). Journal of Molluscan Studies. 77(3): 273-308

 
Horaiclavidae
Monotypic gastropod genera